Denis Anatolyevich Koval (born 6 November 1991, in Irkutsk) is a Russian speed skater. He competed at the 2014 Winter Olympics in Sochi, in the 500 meters.

References

External links

1991 births
Living people
Sportspeople from Irkutsk
Speed skaters at the 2014 Winter Olympics
Russian male speed skaters
Olympic speed skaters of Russia